Max Merkel (7 December 1918 – 28 November 2006) was an Austrian footballer who played international football for both Germany and Austria as a defender. At club level, he played for Rapid Wien, Wiener SC, and Luftwaffen SV Markersdorf.

Managerial honours
Rapid Wien
 Austrian League: 1956–57

1860 Munich
 Bundesliga: 1965–66
 DFB-Pokal: 1963–64
 European Cup Winners' Cup: Runners-up: 1964–65

1. FC Nürnberg
 Bundesliga: 1967–68

Atlético Madrid
 Copa del Generalísimo: 1971–72
 Spanish League: 1972–73

References

1918 births
2006 deaths
Austrian footballers
Austria international footballers
Austrian expatriate sportspeople in Spain
Sevilla FC managers
Austrian football managers
Atlético Madrid managers
Austrian people of German descent
La Liga managers
HBS Craeyenhout football managers
Netherlands national football team managers
Wiener Sport-Club players
SK Rapid Wien players
SK Rapid Wien managers
FC Zürich managers
FC Schalke 04 managers
Borussia Dortmund managers
TSV 1860 Munich managers
1. FC Nürnberg managers
Karlsruher SC managers
FC Augsburg managers
Dual internationalists (football)
Bundesliga managers
Footballers from Vienna
Association football defenders
Austrian expatriate football managers
Germany international footballers
Austrian expatriate sportspeople in West Germany
Expatriate football managers in West Germany
Expatriate football managers in Switzerland
Expatriate football managers in the Netherlands
Austrian expatriate sportspeople in the Netherlands
Austrian expatriate sportspeople in Switzerland
Expatriate football managers in Spain